Crossopetalum, commonly known as Christmas-berries or maiden berries, is a genus of flowering plants in the family Celastraceae. It comprises about 30-40 species.

Description 
Crossopetalum taxa are shrubs or trees, with opposite or whorled persistent leaves with petiole and stipules. Inflorescences are axillary, regrouping white, pale green, reddish, or purplish radially symmetric flowers, with four sepals, four petals, and a four-carpellate pistil. Intrastaminal nectaries are annular and fleshy. Fruits are red drupes, with one-two seeds per fruit.

Etymology 
It alludes to the fimbriate petals of the type species (C. rhacoma).

The synonym name Myginda is a taxonomic anagram derived from the name of the confamilial genus Gyminda. The latter name is a taxonomic patronym honoring Franz von Mygind (1710 - 1789), a Danish-Austrian court official, who traveled to Barbados, collected plants with herbarium specimens hosted in the Hungarian Natural History Museum in Budapest, and was a friend of Nikolaus Joseph von Jacquin.

Systematics 
According to Plants of the World Online, 36 species are recognized.

 Crossopetalum aquifolium (Griseb.) Hitchc.
 Crossopetalum bokdamii Breteler & Buerki
 Crossopetalum coriaceum Northr.
 Crossopetalum cristalense Borhidi
 Crossopetalum decussatum (Baill.) Lourteig
 Crossopetalum densiflorum Lundell
 Crossopetalum ekmanii (Urb.) Alain
 Crossopetalum enervium Hammel
 Crossopetalum filipes (Sprague) Lundell
 Crossopetalum gaumeri (Loes.) Lundell
 Crossopetalum glabrum Lundell
 Crossopetalum gomezii Lundell
 Crossopetalum ilicifolium (Poir.) Kuntze
 Crossopetalum lanceifolium (Lundell) Lundell
 Crossopetalum lobatum Lundell
 Crossopetalum macrocarpum (Brandegee) Lundell
 Crossopetalum managuatillo (Loes.) Lundell
 Crossopetalum minimiflorum Lundell
 Crossopetalum mossambicense I.Darbysh.
 Crossopetalum orientale Mory
 Crossopetalum oxyphyllum (S.F.Blake) Lundell
 Crossopetalum panamense Lundell
 Crossopetalum parviflorum (Hemsl.) Lundell
 Crossopetalum parvifolium L.O.Williams
 Crossopetalum pungens (C.Wright) Rothm.
 Crossopetalum rhacoma Crantz
 Crossopetalum riparium (Lundell) Lundell
 Crossopetalum rostratum (Urb.) Rothm.
 Crossopetalum scoparium (Hook. & Arn.) Kuntze
 Crossopetalum serrulatum (Loes.) I.Darbysh.
 Crossopetalum shaferi (Britton & Urb.) Alain
 Crossopetalum standleyi (Lundell) Lundell
 Crossopetalum subsessile L.O.Williams
 Crossopetalum ternifolium (Urb.) Alain
 Crossopetalum theodes (Benth.) Kuntze
 Crossopetalum uragoga (Jacq.) Kuntze

References 

Celastraceae
Celastrales genera